Seroe Colorado (also: Ceru Colorado and Colorado Point) is a village on the island of Aruba, located at the very southeastern tip of the island. Nowadays it is known for the Anchor in Memory to All Seamen, Between 1878 and 1914, it was the site of the Colorado Guano Mine. The Seroe Colorado Lighthouse is located in Seroe Colorado.

History
In 1873 or 1874, guano was discovered on Seroe Colorado by Henri Waters Gravenhorst. In 1879, Ch. B. Sewell from London and the Aruba Island Gold Mining Company founded the Aruba Phosphaatmaatschappij to mine the area. The mining started in open quarry mines. Later shaft mines were used. A pier was built in the harbour of San Nicolaas, and a six kilometres narrow-gauge railway line was constructed to connect Seroe Colorado with San Nicolaas. 

During World War II, guns were placed on Colorado Point to protect the nearby oil refinery at Lago Colony. In the 21st century, the village and surrounding area have become empty and quiet.

Education
International School of Aruba (1929)

Anchor in Memory to All Seamen

On 31 March 1985, the day the Lago Oil Refinery closed, an anchor was placed on the beach. The red anchor is almost five metres tall, and has become an often photographed tourist attraction. It was manufactured in Germany in the 1960s, and was lost at sea. The anchor is dedicated to all the seamen who lost their life at sea.

References

Populated places in Aruba
San Nicolaas